Aagraham may refer to:

 Aagraham (1984 film), an Indian Malayalam-language film
 Aagraham (1993 film), an Indian Telugu-language action drama film